The Kermandie Football Club was an Australian rules football club that played in the Southern Football League in Tasmania, Australia. The club was founded in 1887 and went out of existence in March 2010.

Honours

Club
 Huon Football Association
 Premierships (23): 1905, 1910, 1911, 1916, 1919, 1921, 1924, 1927, 1929, 1930, 1936, 1937, 1939, 1946, 1949, 1952, 1954, 1956, 1961, 1965, 1969, 1993, 1996
 Runners Up (12): 1921, 1928, 1934, 1938, 1948, 1953, 1958, 1962, 1970, 1977, 1988, 1995
 Southern Football League
 Premierships (3): 2000, 2005, 2007

Individual
Peter Hodgeman Medalists
2007 - Andrew Nash

William Leitch Medalists 
Nil.

Club Record Games Holder 
400 by Shane O'Neil

Club Record Attendance 
5,401 - Kermandie 13.11 (89) v New Norfolk 8.11 (59) - 2000 SFL Grand Final at North Hobart Oval

Club Record Score 
Not Documented.

External links
Kermandie FC on Australian Rules website

Australian rules football clubs in Tasmania
1887 establishments in Australia
2010 disestablishments in Australia
Australian rules football clubs established in 1887
Australian rules football clubs disestablished in 2010